Charruodon is an extinct genus of cynodonts which existed in the Hyperodapedon Assemblage Zone of the Santa Maria Formation in the Paraná Basin in southeastern Brazil during the Late Triassic. The genus contains only the type species Charruodon tetracuspidatus, which is known from a single specimen of uncertain provenance. Upon its first description, Charruodon was tentatively placed within the family Therioherpetidae, but a 2017 study by Agustín G. Martinelli and colleagues instead recovered it as a more basal member of Probainognathia.

References 

Prehistoric probainognathians
Prehistoric cynodont genera
Late Triassic synapsids of South America
Triassic Brazil
Fossils of Brazil
Santa Maria Formation
Fossil taxa described in 2000